Marmarinae is a subfamily of moths described by Akito Yuji Kawahara and Issei Ohshima in 2016.

Diversity and distribution

Description

Biology

Genera
In alphabetical order:

Dendrorycter Kumata, 1978
Marmara Clemens, 1863

References

 
Moth subfamilies